Qaraağacı (also, Qarağacı, Qaraağaçı, Gharaaghach’i, Karaagadzhi, and Karaagadzhy) is a village and municipality in the Tartar Rayon of Azerbaijan.  It has a population of 1,302.

References 

Populated places in Tartar District